Deepstar 4000 was a U.S. Navy/civilian deep-submergence vehicle designed by Jacques Cousteau and built by Westinghouse. It was built in 1965 and retired in 1972. Some of the explorations of Deepstar 4000 were shown in the January 1971 edition of National Geographic. At the time of the article, Deepstar 4000 had already completed more than 200 dives in the Atlantic, Pacific, and Caribbean. This number of completed dives appears to be understated. In R. Frank Busby's book Manned Submersibles, it is stated on page 53 that the Deepstar 4000 "conducted some 500 dives from June 1966 through June 1968".

History 
The U.S. Naval Oceanographic Office used Deepstar 4000 for 13 dives during October and November 1967. Marine geology, biology and the physical properties of the water column were studied on the 10 deep dives of this series. These dives were accomplished along the east coast of the United States and in the Caribbean. Great similarities in the bottom features at widely separated sites as well as dissimilarities in adjacent areas were particularly noteworthy.

During this operation Deepstar 4000 was evaluated as a Deep Oceanographic Survey Vehicle (DOSV). The lack of an all-weather capability and the rather limited payload hampered this study, but the overlapping fields of the viewports and the ability to operate in very close proximity to the bottom, regardless of terrain, are desirable features that should be included on any future DOSV.

Crewed deep submergence vehicles offer optimum methods for observing the actual ocean environment. Advantages of submersibles include: capabilities of mounting multiple equipments with short cables, visually monitoring instruments during data acquisition, and controlling proximity to the seafloor—significant improvements over suspending sensors with miles of cables from rolling, pitching surface craft.

On one Deep Star 4000 dive south of San Diego, California, the crew, Dr. Eugene C. La Fond and pilot, narrowly escaped tragedy when the ascent system and its backup failed at 3,500 feet down. The weights normally meant to detach to allow ascent would not release. To save the craft, hundreds of pounds of mercury ballast used for trim was hand pumped onto the ocean floor and the craft could rise.

Equipment 
Instrument packages have consisted of three precision velocimeters (two NUS TR-4's and one TR-5), two Dymec temperature sensors, one Bissett-Berman salinometer, one or two Vibrotrons, and four Fjarlie bottles with four reversing thermometers each. Accuracy is enhanced by meticulous calibrations before and after dive series, delicate handling of all equipment, intercomparison of several instruments, consistently careful measurements, and correct assessments of thermal lags and pressure effects. Results are compared with existing equations for sound speed versus temperature, salinity, and pressure. The United States has made a torpedo-shaped probe called the Deep Flight.

References 

Deep-submergence vehicles
1965 ships
Westinghouse Electric Company